Yu Chenghui (16 August 1939 – 4 July 2015), sometimes credited as Yue Sing-wai, was a Chinese actor, action director and martial artist.

Martial arts career
Yu started practising martial arts at the age of 11, specialising in the use of the jian (Chinese sword). He won the championship title at the age of 20 in a wushu competition held in Qingdao. He joined the Shandong wushu team later and emerged as the champion in the zuijian ("Drunken Sword") category in another wushu competition.

Yu once injured his leg during a training session and almost lost the use of his leg due to delayed medical treatment. He left the wushu team later to recover from his injury and worked in a factory for the next decade or so. During that period of time, Yu spent his free time studying martial arts and interacting with other martial artists to improve his techniques until he had fully recovered.

For 14 years during the course of his martial arts career, Yu had been working on recreating the shuang shou jian (double-handed sword) movement, which was believed to be extinct since the Tang Dynasty. In the wee hours of the morning of 15 September 1975, during a thunderstorm, Yu saw how a praying mantis reacted in response to the heavy downpour and conceived the ideas for completing the design of the swordplay technique. The shuang shou jian is now officially recognised as a category in wushu competitions.

Film and television career
Yu was discovered by film director Chang Hsin-yen of Great Wall Pictures, who cast him as the villain "Wang Renze" in the 1982 film Shaolin Temple, which starred Jet Li as the protagonist. Following his first successful role in Chinese cinema, Yu continued to star in other martial arts films such as Kids From Shaolin (1984) and Martial Arts of Shaolin (1986).

In 1993, Yu served as the action director for the film Donggui Yingxiong Zhuan and was awarded the "Star of Martial Arts" kudos by the Chinese Wushu Association in 1998 for his unique achievements in his martial arts choreography on screen.

In the 2000s, Yu turned his attention to wuxia-themed television series. Between 2001 and 2009, Yu worked with television series producer Zhang Jizhong on a number of projects, mostly in adaptations of Louis Cha's wuxia novels. He also portrayed Ip Man in the 2008 television series The Legend of Bruce Lee.

Yu stated in a 2005 newspaper interview that he never shaved his trademark beard, even at the request of movie producers, because he wanted to portray Zhou Tong, a famous Song Dynasty military tutor, in a future film. He went on to say "He is an outstandingly able person from the northern and southern Song Dynasties and many Water Margin heroes are his disciples. This person is very important in martial arts and many people want to portray him in films." He died at the age of 75 in 2015.

Filmography

Film

Television

References

External links

 Yu Chenghui at the Chinese Movie Database

1939 births
2015 deaths
Chinese wushu practitioners
Male actors from Yantai
Sportspeople from Yantai
People from Penglai, Shandong
Chinese male television actors
Chinese male film actors
20th-century Chinese male actors
21st-century Chinese male actors